The Alashan wapiti is a subspecies of Cervus canadensis (named "elk" or "wapiti" in North America), found in northern China and Mongolia. It is the smallest subspecies of elk, has the lightest color, and is the least studied, other than the extinct Merriam's elk.

References 

Elk and red deer